Mirpur Jain Temple is situated in Mirpur, a fortified village in the Sirohi district of Rajasthan, India. The village has four Jain temples.

History 
Mirpur Jain Temple was built in the 9th century AD, during the reign of the Rajputs. The Mirpur temple is generally thought to be the oldest marble monument in Rajasthan. It is devoted to the 23rd Jain tirthankara, Pārśva. The temple was destroyed by Mahmud Begada in the 13th century, and was rebuilt and renovated in the 15th century. These days only  the main temple with its mandapa is standing, high on its pedestal with carved pillars and engraved parikrama representing every aspect of Indian mythology. The temple has inscriptions which date back to 1162 AD in the temple mentioning history of Hamirgarh. There are seven inscription dating back from 12th to 15th century and latest inscription dating backing to 19th century.

Main temple 
Mirpur Jain Temple was built in the 9th century AD. Mirpur Jain temple is architecturally most important building near Sirohi. This temple is also mentioned in the ‘World And Encyclopedia of Art’. The temple is famous for its art and exquisite carvings. The fine carvings of the temple is comparable to the ones in Dilwara temples. The domes, pillars and borders are the features unique to this temple. The murals on the ceiling of temple show unique motifs which are not visible in other Jain temples. The kalamandap is standing on its high pedestrian with carved pillars and engraved parikrama representing every walk of life in Indian Mythology. The indescribable artistry of this temple is famous throughout the world and is considered by many to be unmatched. The ancient art of this temple served as a model for the later Dilwara and Ranakpur temples. This temple belongs to Shvetambara sect of Jainism. The Moolnayak of the temple is a 90 cm tall white colored idol of Lord Parshvanatha called Bhidbhanjan Parshwanathji. This sculpture illustrates Parshwanath's triumph over Kamatha's upsargas, in considerable detail. In this sculpture, Dharanendra raises a hood of 5 cobras to provide shelter for Lord Parshwanath from the relentless storm set into motion by Kamatha. The temple walls and pillars are rich with carvings of floral and geometric
designs.

The idols in temple are re-anointed in an annual ceremony. The temple is managed by Seth Shri Kalyanji Paramanandji Pedhi, Sirohi and has a dharmshala, bhojnalya and garden.

Other Temples
 Bhagvan Suparshwanathji Temple: This temple is dedicated to Suparshvanatha. The temple is built in Nagara style. The temple is famous for beautiful glass work of sanctum. This temple belongs to Digamber sect. of Jainism.
 Bhagvan Mahavir Swami Temple: This temple is dedicated to Mahavir Swami. This temple is built in Nagara style. The temple is famous for paintings on dome.
 Bhagvan Shantinath Temple: This is dedicated to Shantinatha. The temple is rich in architecture with an amalgamation of Indo-Persian architecture. It temple has been built in nagara style with decorative pillars and sanctum.

Photo gallery

See also 

 Ranakpur Jain temple
 Dilwara temples

References

Citation

Source 
 
  
  
 
 Indira Gandhi National Centre for the Arts
  
 
 
 

Tourist attractions in Sirohi district
9th-century Jain temples
Jain temples in Rajasthan